Carlyle Elwood Maw (October 13, 1903 – December 1, 1987) was Under Secretary of State for International Security Affairs from July 10, 1974, to September 17, 1976.  Born in Provo, Utah, he graduated from Brigham Young University and from Harvard Law School.  

He had been an attorney in New York City when he went to work for Henry Kissinger as a legal advisor. He was appointed on November 23, 1973, and held this post from November 27, 1973, to July 9, 1974.  Later, as Undersecretary he acted as the President's Special Representative at the 1975 Law of the Sea conferences.  After his return to private practice he also served as chair of the Public Advisory Committee on the Law of the Sea. He died in 1987 in Washington, DC.

He had two sons and one daughter.

Writings
 What Law Now for the Seas, edited by Carlisle Maw, May 1984.

External links
 NY Times obituary

|-

1987 deaths
1903 births
Ford administration personnel
People from Provo, Utah
Brigham Young University alumni
Harvard Law School alumni
American diplomats
United States Under Secretaries of State